A Very Good Production is an American film and television production company founded by comedian, television host, actress Ellen DeGeneres and Warner Bros. Television's Telepictures in 2003. It is known for producing the long-running series The Ellen DeGeneres Show.

The company co-founded the former record label, eleveneleven in 2010.

History
In October 2010, the company signed a multi-year deal with Warner Bros.

On March 17, 2021, it was announced that the company had signed a multi-year production deal with Discovery, Inc. to produce natural history content for the Discovery Channel and Discovery+.

Filmography

Television

In production
 Happy Time (TBA)
 Jekyll (TBA)
 Little Funny (with Telepictures and This is Just a Test) (TBA)
 Too Close To Home (TBA)
 Ellen's Home Design Challenge (TBA)
 Finding Einstein (TBA)
 First Dates Hotel (TBA)

Current
 Family Game Fight! (with Dingus Von Pringus, Telepictures Productions and Warner Horizon Television) (2021–present)

Former
 The Ellen DeGeneres Show (with Telepictures Productions, E. W. Scripps Company and WAD Productions) (2003–2022)
 Bethenny (with Telepictures Productions) (2012–2014)
 Repeat After Me (with Katalyst Media and Warner Horizon Television) (2015)
 One Big Happy (with Visualized, Inc. and Warner Bros. Television) (2015)
 Ellen's Design Challenge (with Telepictures Productions and A. Smith & Co.) (2015–2016)
 Heads Up! (with Telepictures Productions) (2016)
 Little Big Shots (with East 112th Street Productions (2016–2018), On the Day Productions (2020) and Warner Horizon Television) (2016–2020)
 Little Big Shots: Forever Young (with East 112th Street Productions and Warner Horizon Television) (2017)
 First Dates (with Twenty Twenty) (2017)
 Ellen's Game of Games (with Telepictures Productions, Bills Market and Television Productions and Warner Horizon Television) (2017–2021)
 Splitting Up Together (with Piece of Pie Productions and Warner Bros. Television) (2018–2019)
 Green Eggs and Ham (with Gulfstream Pictures, A Stern Talking To and Warner Bros. Animation) (2019–2022)
 The Masked Dancer (with Fox Alternative Entertainment, MBC, and Warner Horizon Unscripted & Alternative Television) (2020–2021)
 Little Ellen (with Warner Bros. Animation, as Ellen Digital Ventures) (2021–2022)

Film
 The Smart One (with Warner Bros. Television) (2012; TV Movie)
 Sophia Grace & Rosie's Royal Adventure (2014)
 Nancy Drew and the Hidden Staircase (2019)

In Production
 Two Steps Forward (with Searchlight Pictures) (TBA)
 Castle Hangnail (with Walt Disney Pictures) (TBA)

Specials
 Tig Notaro: Happy To Be Here (with Funny or Die and Zero Dollars And Zero Sense Productions) (2018)
 Ellen DeGeneres: Relatable (with Tenth Planet and Netflix Studios) (2018)

References

American companies established in 2003
Ellen DeGeneres
Mass media companies established in 2003
Television production companies of the United States

Telepictures